Santa Croce sull'Arno is an Italian town in the province of Pisa, Tuscany.

The city has a leather industry, with more than 400 factories and laboratories spread over its  total area.

Notable people
Giovanni Lami, antiquarian

See also
Staffoli

References